Kütüklü is a village in the Gerger District, Adıyaman Province, Turkey. The village is populated by Kurds of the Mirdêsî tribe and had a population of 218 in 2021.

The hamlets of Çetin and Yamaç are attached to the village.

References

Villages in Gerger District

Kurdish settlements in Adıyaman Province